"Maybe" is a song written by Bill Rice and Sharon Vaughn, and by American country music artists Kenny Rogers and Holly Dunn.  It was released in February 1990 as the fourth single from Rogers' album Something Inside So Strong.  The song reached #25 on the Billboard Hot Country Singles & Tracks chart.

Chart performance

References

1990 singles
Kenny Rogers songs
Holly Dunn songs
Songs written by Bill Rice
Songs written by Sharon Vaughn
Song recordings produced by Jim Ed Norman
Reprise Records singles
1989 songs
Male–female vocal duets